ATtiny (also known as TinyAVR) is a subfamily of the popular 8-bit AVR microcontrollers, which typically has fewer features, fewer I/O pins, and less memory than other AVR series chips.  The first members of this family were released in 1999 by Atmel (later acquired by Microchip Technology in 2016).

Features
ATtiny microcontrollers specifically excludes various common features, such as: USB peripheral, DMA controller, crypto engine, or an external memory bus.

The following table summarizes common features of the ATtiny microcontrollers, for easy comparison.  This table is not meant to be an unabridged feature list.

Notes

 Package column - the number after the dash is the number of pins on the package. DIP packages in this table are  row-to-row. SOwww means SOIC package with a case width of 'www' in thousandth of an inch. Though some package types are known by more than one name, a common name was chosen to make it easier to compare packages.
 UART/I²C/SPI columns -  means a dedicated peripheral, *  means a multi-feature peripheral that is chosen by setting configuration bits.  Most USART peripherals support a minimum choice between UART or SPI, where as some might support additional choices, such as LIN, IrDA, RS-485.
 Timers column - recent families add a 12-bit timer, plus a 16-bit Real Time Counter (RTC) that is driven by a 32.768KHz clock (feature designated with 'R' in the table).
 ADC chans column - the total number of analog channels that are multiplex into the ADC input. Most parts have one ADC, a few have two ADC.
 Pgm/Dbg column - flash programming and debugging protocols: HVPP means High Voltage Parallel Programming 12V protocol, HVSP means High Voltage Serial Programming 12V protocol, ISP means In-System Programmable protocol, uses SPI to program the internal flash. TPI is Tiny Programming Interface. dW means debugWIRE protocol. UPDI means Unified Program and Debug Interface protocol (newest). 

Abbreviations
 TWI: Many of Atmels microcontrollers contain built-in support for interfacing to a two-wire bus, called Two-Wire Interface. This is essentially the same thing as the I²C interface by Philips, but that term is avoided in Atmel's documentation due to trademark issues.
 USI: Universal Serial Interface (not to be confused with USB). The USI is a multi-purpose hardware communication module. With appropriate software support, it can be used to implement an SPI, I²C or UART interface. USART peripherals have more features than USI peripherals.

Timeline
The following table lists each ATtiny microcontroller by the first release date of each datasheet.

Development boards
The following are ATtiny development boards sold by Microchip Technology:
 ATtiny104 Xplained Nano
 ATtiny416 Xplained Nano
 ATtiny817 AVR Parrot
 ATtiny817 Xplained Mini
 ATtiny817 Xplained Pro
 ATtiny3217 Xplained Pro

See also
 AVR microcontrollers
 Atmel AVR instruction set
 In-system programming
 Arduino

References

Further reading
ATtiny
 tinyAVR Microcontroller Projects for the Evil Genius; 1st Ed; Dhananjay Gadre, Nehul Malhotra; McGraw-Hill/TAB; 272 pages; 2011; .

AVR
 AVR Programming: Learning to Write Software for Hardware; 1st Ed; Elliot Williams; Maker Media; 474 pages; 2014; 
 Some Assembly Required: Assembly Language Programming with the AVR Microcontroller; 1st Ed; Timothy Margush; CRC Press; 643 pages; 2011; 
 AVR Microcontroller and Embedded Systems: Using Assembly and C; 1st Ed; Muhammad Ali Mazidi, Sarmad Naimi, Sepehr Naimi; Pearson; 792 pages; 2010; .

External links

 Microchip 8-bit AVR MCU product webpage - Microchip
 Microchip 8-bit AVR MCU product selector (PDF) - Microchip
 Atmel tinyAVR fast and code efficient flyer (PDF) - Microchip
 All tinyAVR parts in a spreadsheet - EDN Magazine, September 8, 2014.
 ATtiny44/84 and ATtiny45/85 Pinout Diagrams

Atmel microcontrollers
Computing comparisons